Holly Fay is a Canadian contemporary artist in Regina, Saskatchewan. She is known for her oil paintings and drawings, which explore themes of nature, perspective, landscape, representation, and history. Her works have been exhibited across Canada and internationally. She is currently an instructor in the Visual Arts Department at the University of Regina and at the Neil Balkwill Civic Arts Centre.

Education 
Fay studied at the University of Regina, receiving her Bachelor of Education in 1985, and her Bachelor of Fine Arts in painting and drawing in 1989. In 1994, she completed her master's degree in Fine Arts at the University of Ulster in Belfast, Northern Ireland.

Career 
Fay's works include drawing, painting, mixed media, and installation projects, focused on themes of landscape, history, perspective, and nature, as well as exploring systems of knowledge, ideas of place, and phenomenology. She has been a part of the Saskatchewan arts community in a number of different ways including, curator, writer, mentor, and artist.

In 2004, the Landscape as Muse documentary series covered Fay's work alongside other artists such as Joe Fafard, Aganetha Dyck, Peter von Tiesenhausen and Edward Burtynsky. The documentary examines the work of Canadian artists and the relationships between art and landscape.

Fay is the board Chair for the Art Gallery of Regina and a member of CARFAC (Canadian Artists' Representation Le Front Des Artistes Canadien) Saskatchewan.

Exhibitions 
Fay has participated in a number of solo and group exhibitions across Canada, including the Mata Gallery, Art Gallery of Regina, and MacKenzie Art Gallery. Her works are held in permanent collections at the Saskatchewan Arts Board, MacKenzie Gallery, and City of Regina.

Solo exhibitions 
 2015 – Floating Worlds, Dunlop Sherwood Gallery, Regina, SK. Drawings in graphite.
 2012 – Systems, Art Gallery of Regina, Regina, SK. Discusses the relationship between human and plat systems.
 2007 – In'Spiral, Neutral Ground, Regina, SK
 2006 – Cover, MATA Gallery, Regina, SK
 1997 – Translating Place, Mackenzie Art Gallery, Regina, SK

Group exhibitions 
 2016 – Ecoart, Gallery 1313, Toronto, ON. This exhibition included artists whose works address environmental issues.
 2014 – Paper Works, MATA Gallery, Regina, SK
 2013 – Restoration, Art Gallery of Estevan, Estevan, SK
 2013 – Embodied Presence, Prince Albert Arts Centre, Prince Albert, SK. In collaboration with Michel Boutin.

Awards 
Fay was awarded the National Visual Arts Advocacy Award in 2015.

References

External links 
 Anderson, Jack. Holly Fay : Plain. Regina, Sask.: Rosemont Art Gallery, 2003. Retrieved 17 March 2016.
 Holly Fay: Systems. 2012. Art Gallery of Regina. Retrieved 17 March 2016.
 Holly Fay: Visual Artist. Artist's website. Retrieved 17 March 2016.
 Long, Timothy. Holly Fay. Regina, Sask.: Mackenzie Art Gallery, 1997. Retrieved 17 March 2016.

Living people
Alumni of Ulster University
Artists from Regina, Saskatchewan
Canadian installation artists
Canadian painters
Canadian women artists
Place of birth missing (living people)
University of Regina alumni
Academic staff of the University of Regina
Year of birth missing (living people)